Acacia insolita is a shrub belonging to the genus Acacia and the subgenus Phyllodineae that is endemic to south western Australia.

Description
The leaves have a bipinnate form and are usually persistent on mature plants. Each pinnae normally contain one pair with 2 to 12 pinnules. It produces yellow-cream flowers from June to September. The simple inflorescences occur singly in the axils. The spherical flower-heads contain 12 to 19 cream to golden coloured flowers.

Taxonomy
There are three recognised subspecies:
 Acacia insolita subsp. efoliolata
 Acacia insolita subsp. insolita
 Acacia insolita subsp. recurva

Distribution
It is native to an area in the South West region of Western Australia where it is found on hills and ridges growing in gravelly sandy soils often containing laterite. The plant along the Darling Range from around Marradong in the north to Nannup in the south.

See also
List of Acacia species

References

insolita
Acacias of Western Australia
Taxa named by Ernst Pritzel
Plants described in 1904